Chydaeopsis is a genus of beetles in the family Cerambycidae, containing the following species:

 Chydaeopsis fragilis Pascoe, 1864
 Chydaeopsis lumawigi Breuning, 1980
 Chydaeopsis luzonica Heller, 1923
 Chydaeopsis mindanaonis Breuning, 1982
 Chydaeopsis ruficollis Aurivillius, 1922

References

Acanthocinini